Laughing on the Outside is the fourth studio album by American singer Aretha Franklin, released on August 12, 1963, by Columbia Records. The album was recorded at Columbia Recording Studios in New York and Hollywood. These sessions found a 21-year-old Aretha Franklin recording Jazz and Pop music standards, from Johnny Mercer to Duke Ellington. She is backed by the arrangements of Columbia producer Robert Mersey.  One of the most popular songs from the album is Aretha's interpretation of the classic "Skylark".  A minute and fifty-eight seconds into the song, Aretha sings the word "Skylark" with power and emotion. This was one of the first times in which Aretha recorded one of her written compositions, "I Wonder (Where Are You Tonight)", on an album. Though somewhat overlooked in her Columbia catalogue, this album was jointly re-released with The Electrifying Aretha Franklin in June 2008.

Track listing

Side One
"Skylark" (Johnny Mercer, Hoagy Carmichael) – 2:49
"For All We Know" (Sam M. Lewis, J. Fred Coots) – 3:25
"Make Someone Happy" (Betty Comden, Adolph Green, Jule Styne) – 3:48
"I Wonder (Where Are You Tonight)" (Aretha Franklin, Ted White) – 3:16
"Solitude" (Duke Ellington, Eddie DeLange, Irving Mills) – 3:50
"Laughing on the Outside" (Bernie Wayne, Ben Raleigh) – 3:14

Side Two
"Say It Isn't So" (Irving Berlin) – 3:05
"Until The Real Thing Comes Along" (Sammy Cahn, Saul Chaplin, L. E. Freeman) – 3:04
"If Ever I Would Leave You" (Alan Jay Lerner, Frederick Loewe) – 4:04
"Where Are You?" (Harold Adamson, Jimmy McHugh) – 3:50
"Mr. Ugly" – 3:22 (Norman Mapp)
"I Wanna Be Around" (Johnny Mercer, Sadie Vimmerstedt) – 2:25

Bonus Tracks on Later Re-issues
"Ol' Man River" (Jerome Kern, Oscar Hammerstein II) – 4:01

Mono Mixes
"You've Got Her" (working title "Let Me Be") (Fred Johnson, Leroy Kirkland, Pearl Woods, Terry Melcher) – 2:40
"Here's Where I Came In (Here's Where I Walk Out)" (Art Wayne, Ben Raleigh) – 2:53
"Say It Isn't So" (Irving Berlin) – 3:08

Personnel
 Aretha Franklin – vocals
 Robert Mersey – producer, arranger, conductor
 Earl Van Dyke, Dave Grusin, Andrew Acker, Leon Russell – piano
 C. Bosler, Ray Pohlman, Melvin Pollan – bass guitar
 Hindel Butts, Hal Blaine – drums
 Don Arnome, Tommy Tedesco, Billy Strange – guitar
 Jimmy Nottingham – trumpet
 Robert Ascher – trombone
 Plas Johnson – saxophone
 Bernard Eichenbaum, Julius Schacter, Leo Kahn, Berl Senofsky, Felix Gigol, Max Pollikoff, George Ockner, John Rublowsky, Sid Sharp, Tibor Zelig, George Poole, Irving Lipschultz, Irving Weinper, Darrel Terwilliger – violin
 R. Dickler, Theodore Israel, Jacob Glick – viola
 Jesse Erlich, Anthony Twardowsky, Joseph Tekula – cello

References

External links
 Aretha Franklin's "Skylark"

Aretha Franklin albums
1963 albums
Columbia Records albums